Alexandra I. Gersten-Vassilaros (born 1960) is an American playwright and actress.
She is the co-author, with Theresa Rebeck, of Omnium Gatherum which was a finalist for the 2004 Pulitzer Prize for Drama.

Gersten-Vassilaros is a graduate of NYU's Tisch School of the Arts.  She is a member of Actors Studio and HB Playwrights Foundation. She is a niece of theatrical producer Bernard Gersten.

Selected works
As playwright
 My Thing of Love 1995
 Supple in Combat 1996
 The Airport Play 1999
 Mother Of Invention 2003
 Omnium Gatherum (co-author) 2003
 The Wedding Play 2004
 The Argument 2005

As actress
 Alone Together by Lawrence Roman  Music Box Theatre  1984
 Loose Ends by Michael Weller  McGinn-Cazale Theatre  1988
 Ladies by Eve Ensler  Theater at St. Clement's Church  1989
 Fear, Anxiety & Depression written and directed by Todd Solondz  (Film)  1989
 Lusting After Pipino's Wife by Sam Henry Kass  Primary Stages  1990
 Beautiful Child by Nicky Silver  Vineyard Theatre  2004

References

External links
 
 Alexandra Gersten-Vassilaros at the Internet Off Broadway Database

1960 births
Living people
20th-century American dramatists and playwrights
Tisch School of the Arts alumni